Cazaux-d'Anglès is a commune in the Gers department in southwestern France.

Geography
The Auzoue forms most of the commune's western border. The Guiroue, a tributary of the Osse, flows north through the middle of the commune.

Population

See also
Communes of the Gers department

References

Communes of Gers